Víctor Saucedo (1919 – 28 July 2012) was a Mexican equestrian. He competed in two events at the 1952 Summer Olympics.

References

1919 births
2012 deaths
Mexican male equestrians
Olympic equestrians of Mexico
Equestrians at the 1952 Summer Olympics
People from Toluca